Stereosternum tumidum (meaning "rigid chest") (Stereos, Greek: “solid, firm”; Sternon, Greek: “chest, breastbone”)  is an extinct genus of mesosaur marine reptile from the Early Permian of Brazil and also the Great Karoo Basin of South Africa. The taxon mesosaur is a monophyletic group containing Brazilosaurus sanpauloensis and Mesosaurus tenuidens.

For most of the 20th century, information of Stereosternum was reported as Mesosaurus. Unlike previous interpretations of Mesosaurs as filter feeding animals, later studies have shown that these animals were very much active aquatic predators. Stereosternum and Mesosaurus are the oldest reported reptile species to have had a range spanning two present-day continents, then joined as Gondwana and they represent the first record of reptile species shared by both Southern Africa and South America.

Description 

Many of the ribs and the Haemal arches are thickened with bone or have a pachyostotic characteristic, which would have helped the animal to be able to dive deep in the water as a counteracting force against buoyancy.

Post-cranial skeleton

Ribs 
One of the more unusual and unique characteristics about the anatomy of Stereosternum is the thickness of the dorsal ribs, which continues to increase in size until the fifth rib, which measures  in width. The ribs are noted here to be holocephalous. With the pachyostosis of the postcrania elements and restricted movement at the appendicular joints, it has been suggested that mesosaurs could not have walked on land, but may have been able to push themselves across terrestrial substrates. When studying the histology of the ribs of Stereosternum and Mesosaurus, the kind of pachyostosis of these two species has, is very much characterized by hyperostosis of the periosteal cortex, increased bone density, which was due to the bone becoming more compact, the absence of free medullary cavity and the remnants of calcified cartilage matrix. This kind of pachyostosis is called “pachyosteosclerosis”.

Axial skeleton 
Another characteristic of Stereosternum is the length of the tail and the amount of caudal vertebrae. As counted by Osborn, there are about 60-64 caudal vertebrae, which is very predictable for an aquatic predator and these adaptations helped individuals to push and swim gracefully in the water. There are also about 34 presacral vertebrae, with 11 cervical and 23 thoracic-lumbar vertebrae. The presence of accessory articulations, like the zygantra and the zygosphenes, are there to supposedly to have dampened the twisting movements of the vertebral column. On the axial pleurocentrum, there is a process that is distinctly analogous to the odontoid structure found in mammals. This probably correlates with the presence of a long skull on a long neck that is found with Stereosternum and this process could have helped to minimize the stresses and movement between the skull and the neck.

Appendicular skeleton 
Another characteristic of Mesosaurs was that they probably had webbing of skin on both their feet and their hands, analogous to that of a duck's foot. This paddle would have easily initiated movement within the water to swim and hunt for food. The phalangeal formula is noted to be 2-3-4-5-3 for the manus, giving them a paddle-like form to it. The pedes are described to have a 2-3-4-5-5 phalangeal formula. In Stereosternum, the humerus has well-developed proximal muscular processes, and the scapulocoracoid is early fused and the Iliac blade has a rounded dorsal margin, and the pubic foramen is early closed. The most distal end of the humerus is shown to be slightly less than 35 per cent of the total length of the humerus.

Skull 
 
Many of the modifications of the bones within the skull seem to reduce drag and help propel the animal through an aqueous environment while swimming and feeding. The skull of Stereosternum is equal to the length of the neck and the anterior half of the skull is not as elongated as in Mesosaurus and this is due to the extension of the premaxilla, which dominates the snout. The position of the external naris is about half way along the skull. The presence of the lower temporal fenestra is absent in these species. There are a total of 12 within the premaxilla and then 14 teeth in the maxilla. The teeth seem to decrease in size from the frontal to the back part in the skull. The tongue-like posterolateral process, however, angles more posteriorly than laterally. The presence of such a process is a mesosaurid apomorphy, distinguishing this animal from other closely related clades. The dentary is a very slender and long bone, holding up to about 45 teeth. There is also the presence of palatal teeth that are much smaller in size than the marginal teeth, and also being sharp, straight and with homodont structures.

Dentition 
Stereosternum had small teeth compared to Mesosaurus tenuidens, but it had larger teeth compared to Brazilosaurus sanpauloensis. The teeth of Stereosternum are 6 times the length of Brazilosaurus sanpauloensis, but has smaller teeth compared to Mesosaurus tenuidens, which has teeth that are 12 times longer than Brazilosaurus. These differentiations with tooth length possibly correspond to different ecological niches being filled. The way the teeth are positioned inside the jaw is a unique feature of this species; with the teeth more apically being inserted within the alveolar bone and the fully developed teeth show dental ankylosis. From looking at the teeth and how they are positioned, it seems that the replacement pulse occurred anteroposteriorly in Stereosternum, in a quasi-alternate polyphyodont pattern. Going more distally, the teeth seem to have periodontal ligaments connecting the teeth to the alveolar bone and then even more distally the tooth is connected by the anchorage trabeculae, which is composed of cementum and probably the alveolar bone. The anchorage trabeculae structure acts as an additional structure to hold the teeth in place. Within the adult teeth, the pulp cavity is enclosed within on itself, and inside those pulp cavities are canals that connect the tooth to the alveolar bone. Those canals were the spaces that were filled by blood vessels and nerves, which supplemented the growth of the tooth and gave the tooth some sensory abilities. During the early part of the development of the teeth, the roots would have been open, and the only connection that would have been facilitated would have been the cementum between the tooth and the alveolar bone, the periodontal ligament and the cementum made anchorage trabeculae would have mediated this connection. This complex, called the tripartite periodontium, during the life of Stereosternum, would have acted as a mechanism for keeping the teeth within the jaw, working against the lateral forces that could easily pull teeth out of the socket, given the size of these teeth. The teeth also have multiple different types of dentine and there are different orientations of the dentine tubules along the tooth, including mixed composition in the dentary wall. These adaptations helped to increase the tooth's resistance to tension forces, especially the lateral forces.

Discovery 

Stereosternum tumidum was discovered by Edward Drinker Cope in 1886, while he was in Brazil and looking over some specimens housed in the Museu Nacional (Rio de Janeiro). When looking at the specimen, he noticed that the characteristics seen in Stereosternum were also seen in Mesosaurus. At the time, E.D. Cope had no certainty about the time period Stereosternum belonged to, thinking that either it came from the Carboniferous or the Permian. He does note that the specimen looked like no other reptile known from the Carboniferous. He also discussed the ribs of the animal and noting how they were long, cylindrical, curved and very robust, reminding him of both Ichthyosaurus and Mesosaurus. Also, he had difficulties in trying to determine the position of Stereosternum, reporting that some characteristic point it into Rhynchocephalia or into Sauropterygia. The specimen that Cope had at the time contained only the posterior half of the animal and so he could not make a decision on whether to place it in Reptiles or in Batrachia. He also made some measurements of the different elements within the fossil, as well as noting the phalangeal formula, going from digits 2-6, as 4-4-4-3.

Classification 
 
Mesosaurs are a clade within the larger clade of Amniota, and are also within the smaller clade of Sauropsida. However, the decision on where specifically mesosaurs should go has been of constant debate and recently there is still discussion about where mesosaurs should be placed in taxonomy. Some paleontologists, like Laurin & Reisz, have put mesosaurs within Parareptilia and others, like Modesto, have had mesosaurs as an outgroup of Parareptilia. It has been suggested that Mesosaurus and Stereosternum formed a clade that was a sister taxon to Brazilosaurus. This phylogeny indicates that the shallow water, living near the coast is plesiomorphic for mesosaurs, whereas the characteristic of Mesosaurus living within a pelagic zone is derived. The evolutionary history is seen as the first mesosaurs were much like Brazilosaurus in form, first conquering the aquatic environments on the coasts of the Ecca sea, and then creatures like Mesosaurus conquer life in the open ocean.

Paleobiology

Diet 
For many of the mesosaurid family, including Stereosternum, fossil evidence seems to suggest that their diet mainly included crustaceans. Evidence of large amounts of the carapaces of crustaceans within the coprolites of mesosaurs have mainly come from the Mangrullo Formation of Uruguay. There has also been evidence of small mesosaurid bones within the coprolites of mesosaurs as well, suggesting that cannibalism within this group did occur. Capturing fish and small mesosaurs would have been easier to catch and swallow, since many of its prey would have been small or soft bodied animals. Post-molt soft bodied crustaceans would have also been prey for Stereosternum and other mesosaurs, although there is very little evidence of this in the fossil record. The idea that Stereosternum used its marginal teeth to impale its prey seems very unlikely and probably used its teeth as a capturing mechanism to quickly entrap and restrain its prey.

Reproduction 
 
There is ample evidence to suggest that mesosaurs may have been the oldest known amniotes that displayed extended embryo retention, which could have been either oviparous or viviparous within the same species. When laying their embryos on land, they mostly would have done it on coastal and moist areas and could have buried the eggs as a way to avoid desiccation. Also, when looking at the anatomical structure of the mesosaur pelvic region, the evidence of the fusion of the ribs to the two sacral vertebrae, as well as a weak articulation between these ribs and the Iliac blade, suggests that mesosaurs had the capability to move on dry land and to deposit their eggs on land, plausibly close to water. The females probably carried one to two embryos at a time and the hatchings are interpreted to be about 10% of the adult body length. When comparing mesosaurs and their size differences between the adults and hatchlings to how monotremes and marsupials raise their young, the idea that parental care of the offspring or of the eggs until hatching occurring in mesosaurs is up for speculation.

Paleoecology 
Mesosaurs have been found in the Whitehill Formation (Ecca Group) of the Karoo Basin of South Africa and the Irati Formation (Passa Dois Group) of the Paraná Basin in Brazil. Stereosternum, including some fossils of Brazilosaurus, are found in the limestone deposits of the São Paulo area of Brazil and in the Kalahari Karoo Basin, where the limestone was deposited in more shallow waters than the Mesosaurus-bearing black shales of both the Irati and Whitehill Formations. Within the limestone, there is evidence of ripple marks, erosion cuts, and intra-formational clasts, strongly suggesting that the energy of the depositional environment at the time was higher than that of the black shale deposits. With evidence of the coastlines of this sea on both continents, it is evident that there did exist an inland seaway during the Early Permian, stretching east into the Great Karoo Basin of South Africa and west into the Paraná Basin, with an oceanic link that has been proposed being towards the extreme south of the basins. Mesosaurus seems to have been living out in the deep waters, relative to the shallow waters of Stereosternum and Brazilosaurus. Within these shallow waters, Stereosternum was spending most of its time within the shallow waters and probably going out into the deeper waters inhabited by Mesosaurus, while Brazilosaurus was thought to have probably been semi-aquatic and was mostly restrained to living within the shallow intertidal and coastal areas. However, evidence of both Mesosaurus and Stereosternum fossils being found in the black shales of both formations suggest that Stereosternum did cross over the sea way and could have survived being in the deeper part of this ancient sea. These shales were probably deposited in deep waters, going to a maximum depth of  within the sea. Within this deeper part of the sea, the water column was very stratified, with a fresh and habitable upper layer that was on top of the anoxic, highly sulphurated, toxic bottom brines. The depositional environment was almost stagnant, a grand difference from the more higher energy depositional environment of the shallower waters closer to the coasts. Within those surface waters, there a whole host of organisms from the sea going mesosaurids to the Palaeoniscoid fishes, with the bottom half of the water column that could not support a benthic zone due to the toxic bottom brines. The lithology representing that bottom half of the water column are black shales and also carbonaceous oil is found in the same area.

Stereosternum tumidum and Brazilosaurus sanpauloensis have been recently considered as nomina dubia and synonymized to Mesosaurus by Graciela Piñeiro, Jorge Ferigolo, Alvaro Mones and Pablo Nuñez Demarco (2021), after a detailed anatomical and taphonomic study of more than 500 specimens from palaeontological collections of several countries, which demonstrated that most of the characters used to distinguish three mesosaur taxa are indeed derived of the preservation of specimens in different ontogenetic stages and others are influenced by taphonomy. These results were also supported by morphometric analyses applied to specific region of the skeleton such as the vertebral column and limb bones by Pablo Nuñez Demarco, Jorge Ferigolo and Graciela Piñeiro (2022) and by an incredible similar article by Antoine Verrière and Jörg Fröbisch (2022), which was submitted posteriorly to the acceptation of the Nuñez Demarco et al. (2022) paper. Nuñez Demarco et al. (2022) found that juvenile and adult mesosaurs do not display appreciable change in bone proportions during growth, suggesting a surprising isometric pattern in mesosaurs which is a rare condition for reptiles. The isometry, and particularly, the high interrelation between metatarsals and phalanges permit us to suggest that the mesosaur hind limb is subject to notable modularity. This evidence strongly argues that the differences previously described to support three mesosaur species in Western Gondwana, might instead reflect natural intraspecific variability, taphonomic features or even possible sexual dimorphism, as recently suggested by Piñeiro et al. (2021).

References 

Piñeiro, G., Ferigolo, J., Mones, A. & Núñez Demarco, P. 2021. Mesosaur taxonomy: Are Stereosternum and Brazilosaurus valid taxa?. Revista Brasileira de Paleontologia, 24(3):205–235.
Núñez Demarco, P., Ferigolo, J., and Piñeiro, G. 2022. Isometry in mesosaurs: Implications for growth patterns in early amniotes. Acta Palaeontologica Polonica 67 (2): 509–542. https://doi.org/10.4202/app.00931.2021 
Verrière, A. and Fröbisch, J. Ontogenetic, dietary, and environmental shifts in Mesosauridae. PeerJ 10:e13866. DOI: 10.7717/peerj.13866

External links 

Prehistoric reptile genera
Permian reptiles of South America
Permian Brazil
Fossils of Brazil
Permian Paraguay
Fossils of Paraguay
Paraná Basin
Permian reptiles of Africa
Fossils of Namibia
Fossils of South Africa
Karoo
Fossil taxa described in 1885
Taxa named by Edward Drinker Cope